Moonlight is a play written by Harold Pinter, which premiered at the Almeida Theatre, in London, in September 1993.

Setting
1. Andy's bedroom — well furnished
2. Fred's bedroom — shabby
(These rooms are in different locations.)
3. An area in which Bridget appears, through which Andy moves at night and where Jake, Fred and Bridge play their scene. (Grove Press ed., n. pag.)

Synopsis
Andy, who is on his deathbed,
rehashes his youth, loves, lusts, and betrayals with his wife, [Bel], while simultaneously his two sons [Fred and Jake] – clinical, conspiratorial, the bloodless, intellectual offspring of a hearty anti-intellectual – sit in the shadows, speaking enigmatically and cyclically, stepping around and around the fact of their estrangement from their father, rationalizing their love-hate relations with him and the distance that they are unable to close even when their mother attempts to call them home. In counterpoint to their uncomprehending isolation between the extremes of the death before life and the death after is their younger sister, Bridget, who lightly bridges the gaps between youth and age, death and life.  (Back cover of the Grove Press ed.)

Characters
ANDY, a man in his fifties
BEL, a woman of fifty
JAKE, a man of twenty-eight
FRED, a man of twenty-seven
MARIA, a woman of fifty
RALPH, a man in his fifties
BRIDGET, a girl of sixteen (Grove Press ed., n. pag.)

Productions

Premiere
First performed at the Almeida Theatre, London, on 7 September 1993; transferred to the Comedy Theatre in November 1993
Cast
Ian Holm (Andy)
Anna Massey (Bel)
Douglas Hodge (Jake)
Michael Sheen (Fred)
Jill Johnson (Maria)
Edward de Souza (Ralph)
Claire Skinner (Bridget)
Production team
David Leveaux, director
Bob Crowley, Designer (HaroldPinter.org)

New York premiere
At the Laura Pels Theatre, Roundabout Theatre Company, 27 September – 17 December 1995
Opening Night Cast
Melissa Chalsma (Bridget)
Blythe Danner (Bel)
Paul Hecht (Ralph)
Barry McEvoy (Fred)
Jason Robards (Andy)
Liev Schreiber (Jake)
Kathleen Widdoes (Maria)

Production team
Karel Reisz, director 
Tony Walton, Set Designer 
Mirena Rada, Costume Designer 
Richard Pilbrow, Lighting Designer 
Tom Clark, Sound Designer (IOBDB)

BBC Radio 3 programme
Part of Harold Pinter Double Bill (with Voices) originally broadcast to marking Pinter's 75th birthday, in October 2005; rebroadcast as part of the Harold Pinter Tribute on BBC Radio 3's Drama on 3, on 15 February 2009.
Cast
Harold Pinter (Andy)
Sara Kestelman (Bel)
John Shrapnel(Ralph)
Jill Johnson (Maria)
Douglas Hodge (Jake)
Harry Burton (Fred)
Indira Varma (Bridget)

Production team
Janet Whitaker, director
Elizabeth Parker, Music

Works cited

Pinter, Harold.  Moonlight, New York: Grove Press, 1994.   (10).   (13).  (Parenthetical references to this edition appear in the text.)
–––.  Moonlight.  Harold Pinter Double Bill (with Voices).  BBC Radio 3 Drama Programmes – Drama on 3. BBC, 15 February 2009.  Web.  15 February 2009.  [First broadcast Oct. 2005, as part of Pinter's 75th birthday celebration.  Re-broadcast 15 February 2009, as part of Harold Pinter Tribute.  (Streaming audio accessible for 7 days after broadcasts).]

References

External links
Moonlight – HaroldPinter.org: Official Website of the International Playwright Harold Pinter.
 

Plays by Harold Pinter
1993 plays